Ivars Edmunds Kalniņš (born 1 August 1948) is a Latvian film and television actor. He graduated in 1974 from the Jāzeps Vītols Theatre Department of the Latvian Conservatory. He had already started acting however in 1972 at the Artistic Academic Theatre of J. Rainis. Kalniņš has performed in both Latvian language and Russian language films and television shows.

Selected filmography
 Apple in the River (1974)
 Theatre (1978)
 Little Tragedies (1979)
  Unfinished Supper (1979)
 The Fairfax Millions (1980)
 Do Not Shoot at White Swans (1980)
 Dusha (1982)
 Incident at Map Grid 36-80 (1982)
 TASS Is Authorized to Declare... (1984)
 The Winter Cherry (1985)
 The Dolphin's Cry (1986)
 Entrance to the Labyrinth (1989)
 Frenzied Bus (1990)
 Mirror Wars (2005)
 Bes v Rebro ili Velikolepnaja chetverka  (2006)

References

External links
 
 Peoples.ru: biography, interview, picture gallery 

1948 births
Living people
Actors from Riga
Democratic Party "Saimnieks" politicians
Deputies of the 6th Saeima
Latvian male film actors
Soviet male actors
20th-century Latvian male actors
21st-century Latvian male actors
Latvian Academy of Music alumni